Palladium Theatre or Palladium Theater may refer to:

Palladium (New York City)
Palladium Theatre (St. Petersburg, Florida)
Worcester Palladium
London Palladium, a 2,286 seat West End theatre located off Oxford Street in the City of Westminster 
 The Hollywood Palladium, a theater located at 6215 Sunset Boulevard in Hollywood, California